Dzyanis Sashcheka (born 3 October 1981) is a Belarusian former professional footballer.

Honours
MTZ-RIPO Minsk
Belarusian Cup winner: 2007–08

External links

1981 births
Living people
Belarusian footballers
Association football midfielders
Belarus international footballers
Belarus under-21 international footballers
Belarusian expatriate footballers
Expatriate footballers in Sweden
Belarusian Premier League players
Allsvenskan players
FC RUOR Minsk players
FC Torpedo-BelAZ Zhodino players
Halmstads BK players
FC Partizan Minsk players
FC Granit Mikashevichi players
FC Belshina Bobruisk players
FC Minsk players
FC SKVICH Minsk players
FC Gorodeya players
FC Torpedo Minsk players
People from Asipovichy District
Sportspeople from Mogilev Region